Nedašov is a municipality and village in Zlín District in the Zlín Region of the Czech Republic. It has about 1,400 inhabitants.

History
The first written mention of Nedašov is from 1424.

References

Villages in Zlín District